Pemagatsel, also transliterated as Pemagatsel, is a town in Pemagatshel District in eastern Bhutan.

References

External links
Satellite map at Maplandia.com

Populated places in Bhutan